Ingemar Skogö (4 January 1949 – 28 May 2019) was a Swedish civil servant. Born in Tranås, Skogö was a graduate of Lund University. He served as the Governor of Västmanland County from 2009 to 2015. Skogö was also the Director-General of the Civil Aviation Administration from 1992 to 2001, and the Swedish Road Administration from 2001 to 2009.

Skogö died on 28 May 2019, at the age of 70.

References

1949 births
2019 deaths
County governors of Sweden
Lund University alumni
People from Tranås Municipality
Swedish civil servants